Fragkos is a surname. Notable people with the surname include:

 Emmanouil Fragkos, Greek politician
 Michail Fragkos (born 1990), Greek footballer

Greek-language surnames